Slightly Scandalous is a 1946 American comedy film directed by Will Jason and written by Erna Lazarus, David Mathews, Joel Malone and Jerry Warner. The film stars Frederick Brady, Sheila Ryan, Paula Drew, Walter Catlett, Lita Baron, Louis DaPron and Jack Marshall. It was released on August 2, 1946 by Universal Pictures.

Plot

Cast        
Frederick Brady as Jerry Roberts / John Roberts / James Roberts 
Sheila Ryan as Christine Wright
Paula Drew as Trudy Price
Walter Catlett as Mr. Wright
Lita Baron as Lola
Louis DaPron as Rocky
Jack Marshall as Erwin
Nick Moro as Mexican Singer
Frank Yaconelli as Mexican Singer 
Anne O'Neal as Minerva Wright 
Dorese Midgley as Specialty Dancer
Georgann Smith as Specialty Dancer

References

External links
 

1946 films
American comedy films
1946 comedy films
Universal Pictures films
Films directed by Will Jason
American black-and-white films
1940s English-language films
1940s American films